The Apollo Club of Minneapolis is a choral organization founded in Minneapolis, Minnesota.  The organization has been in operation since 1895, making it one of the oldest continually performing ensembles in the United States.

History
The Apollo Club has a history intertwined with the music community of the Twin Cities, with roots dating back to 1887.  In the spring of 1895, steps were taken to create a male chorus, and the organization was officially formed and organized on September 23, 1895.  Emil Oberhoffer was the first conductor of the choir, who established a high standard of choral singing. The first public performance from the Apollo Club occurred in the Lyceum Theater, located in downtown Minneapolis, on April 13, 1896.  Notable conductors and accompanists of the ensemble include Henry S. Woodruff, Theodore Bergman, Elsie Wolf Campbell, William Rhys-Herbert, William MacPhail, James S. Allen, and Roger Hoel.  The Apollo Club of Minneapolis was inducted into the Minnesota Music Hall of Fame November 4, 2017.

Honored Members 
Honored membership may be granted to a member who has been an active member for 15 or more years, and has excelled in the following qualifications:

 High qualities of Club leadership
 Unselfish dedication and service to the Club
 Ability to encourage, create and maintain a high degree of Club Morale
 Other unusual circumstances may be considered by the Board in its discretion

50-Year Members

Choral Directors

Past Presidents

Regular Concerts

Notable performances 
The Seven Wonders of the World film
"Invited by Writer Lowell Thomas to perform two pieces for his 1956 motion picture—with a live performance of its premier in Chicago. "This Is My Country" served as the background of the film's finale."

Inaugural Ball, President Eisenhower
"Performed in 1957 as part of the inaugural festivities in Washington D.C., launching President Dwight Eisenhower's second term in office."

Brussels' World Fair
"Garnered fame on the global stage by performing at Expo 58 in 1958."

Eisteddfod International Choral Competition, Wales
"Earned the distinguished honor of second place in this world competition in 1982 — being the first chorus in any category to place in the top three of first-time performers."

International Choral Kathaumixw Festival
"Held in British Columbia, Canada, Apollo performed and placed second in the "Equal Voice Choir" Division in 1998."

Carnegie Hall
"Apollo Club continues its tradition of offering world-class performances in the Twin Cities and beyond with a performance at New York's Carnegie Hall in 2014."

Minnesota Music Hall of Fame  Apollo Club of Minneapolis inducted into Minnesota Music Hall of Fame.  Friday, November 3rd, 2017.  Turner Hall in New Ulm, Minnesota

References

External links 

Arts organizations based in Minneapolis
Choral societies